Jorma Rainer Valkama (October 4, 1928, Viipuri – December 11, 1962) was a Finnish athlete who competed mainly in the long jump.

He competed for Finland in the 1956 Summer Olympics held in Melbourne, Australia in the long jump where he won the bronze medal.

References

1928 births
1962 deaths
Sportspeople from Vyborg
Finnish male long jumpers
Olympic bronze medalists for Finland
Athletes (track and field) at the 1952 Summer Olympics
Athletes (track and field) at the 1956 Summer Olympics
Athletes (track and field) at the 1960 Summer Olympics
Olympic athletes of Finland
Medalists at the 1956 Summer Olympics
Olympic bronze medalists in athletics (track and field)